Rage is a 1972 American thriller / mystery film starring George C. Scott, Richard Basehart, Martin Sheen and Barnard Hughes. Scott also directed this drama about a sheep rancher who is fatally exposed to a military lab's poison gas. The plot was inspired by a true event, the Dugway sheep incident in which a jet accidentally sprayed VX, a lethal nerve gas, in Utah's Skull Valley resulting in the deaths of 3,000-6,000 sheep. Nicolas Beauvy is featured as the rancher's son in a cast that also includes Paul Stevens and Stephen Young.

Plot 

While on a camping trip, Wyoming sheep rancher Dan Logan (Scott) and his son are inadvertently exposed to a secret Army nerve gas from a helicopter passing overhead. Both end up in a hospital where the military, with the help of a military doctor (Sheen) conspire to keep them apart, limit their contact to outsiders, and lie to them about their condition. The military looks at the incident as little more than an opportunity to study the effectiveness of a nerve gas on humans.

Logan tries to hold someone accountable for their actions, but he and his family physician (Basehart) are stone-walled from every angle by military authorities and by bureaucrats staging a cover-up—with those responsible already well insulated by their positions of power. He is hospitalized and put under observation by the government for symptoms related to exposure to nerve agents, and to record his physiological responses to the toxins.

Becoming increasingly anxious over his son, Logan leaves his room to search the hospital.  His investigation leads him to the morgue, where he is traumatized to find his son dead. Initially stunned and shocked at the sight of his son's mutilated body, he becomes enraged.

Having determined the company that has manufactured the nerve agent which has killed his son, he destroys it. At this point he begins exhibiting obvious symptoms of the nerve agent, and heads toward the military base from which the nerve agent was dispersed. He breaches the base's security fence, but is obviously allowed to do so. Logan stops the truck and stumbles out, falling to the ground as helicopters circle above. Soon he is surrounded by army troops while he lies twitching and convulsing in the final stages of nerve agent poisoning. Major Holliford approaches the body and requests a syringe, seemingly to draw blood from Logan's dead body. The film concludes with Logan's body transported to a lab for study by the military.

Cast
 George C. Scott as Dan Logan
 Richard Basehart as Dr. Caldwell
 Martin Sheen as Major Holliford
 Barnard Hughes as Dr. Spencer
 Ed Lauter as Simpson

Reception
Vincent Canby of The New York Times described the film as "a bit schizoid. What it says and what it looks like don't have much in common." Gene Siskel of the Chicago Tribune gave the film two stars out of four and wrote, "As good an actor as he is, and 'Rage' is a decent example of his strength, Scott is a dismal director. The film also includes would-be arty slow-motion shots of coffee being thrown on a campfire, sedatives being handed to a hospital patient, and a cat jumping on a sofa. None of them make any sense except as errors by a fledgling director." Charles Champlin of the Los Angeles Times was positive, calling it "entertainment with a message, and a very striking performance by Scott on both ends of the camera." Arthur D. Murphy of Variety called it "a sluggish, tired and tiring melodrama" which "just doesn't work." Gary Arnold of The Washington Post wrote that "the first half of the movie generates some tangible suspense and human interest," but then "goes resolutely, fatalistically downhill, discarding the element it can spare the least—the viewer's willingness to identify with the hero."

References

External links 
 
 

1972 films
Films directed by George C. Scott
Warner Bros. films
Films scored by Lalo Schifrin
1972 directorial debut films
Films set in Wyoming
Films about chemical war and weapons
1970s English-language films